Sargus decorus is a species of soldier fly in the family Stratiomyidae.

See also
 Sargus albibarbus
 Sargus bipunctatus

References

Further reading

 

Stratiomyidae
Articles created by Qbugbot
Insects described in 1824